There were four equestrian events at the 2014 South American Games. This event served as a qualifier for the 2015 Pan American Games in Toronto, Canada.

Medal summary

Medal table

Medalists

References

Results

Equestrian
South American Games
Qualification tournaments for the 2015 Pan American Games
2014
Equestrian sports competitions in Chile